Jakob Goldschmidt (also Jacob Goldschmidt; born 31 December 1882 in Eldagsen; died 23 September 1955 in New York) was a German-Jewish banker.

Career
Goldschmidt studied banking from H. Oppenheimer in Hanover. In 1907 he worked at the National Bank in Berlin. In 1909 Goldschmidt founded the private bank Schwarz. Goldschmidt held up to 123 supervisory board mandates, including in Ufa, founded in 1917, and IG Farben (1931–1932).

Art Collector 
Goldschmidt's extensive art collection, which was auctioned off by the Nazis in the 1940s, has been the subject of restitution claims.

Literature
 Michael Jurk: Jakob Goldschmidt. About the life and work of a Jewish banker 1882–1955. Master's thesis from the University of Mainz. Mainz 1984.
 Gerald D. Feldman : Jakob Goldschmidt, the history of banking crisis of 1931 and the problem of freedom of maneuver in the Weimar economy. In: Torn Interwar Period. Economic and historical contributions. Commemorative for Knut Borchardt. Baden-Baden 1994, p307.
 Gerald D. Feldman: Jewish bankers and the crisis of the Weimar Republic (Leo Baeck Memorial Lecture. Volume 39). New York 1995.
Bertelsmann Lexikon Verlag, Gütersloh u. a. 1971, column 249.
 Hans-Christian Rohde: We are Germans with a Jewish religion. History of the Jews in Eldagsen and Springe, Bennigsen, Gestorf, Völksen (Hallermunter writings. 2). Museum in the castle courtyard, Springe 1999. p. 40–41.

References

German bankers
1882 births
1955 deaths
People from Hanover Region
German Jews
German emigrants to the United States